Acton was a constituency of the House of Commons of the Parliament of the United Kingdom, created for the 1918 general election. It elected one Member of Parliament (MP) by the first-past-the-post system of election.

The constituency was abolished for the 1983 general election, and replaced by Ealing Acton.

Boundaries
The seat was created by the Representation of the People Act 1918 which increased the number of seats where population had expanded such as in Middlesex due to the conurbation growing around the County of London. It was based on the town of Acton. The seat consisted of the Acton Urban District which became a Municipal Borough in 1921.

A redistribution of Parliamentary seats, which took effect at the 1950 United Kingdom general election made no change to the boundaries; its legislation, affecting election expenses and returning officer re-classified, the seat as a borough constituency.

In 1965 the area became part of the London Borough of Ealing and Greater London.

In the redistribution which took effect at the February 1974 general election, the seat to the west, Ealing South, was abolished and this seat absorbed most of its area to reach the electoral quota, it having been heavily underweight in electorate. The seat in statute and statutory instrument became variously Ealing: Acton and/or simply Acton where under a heading of London Borough of Ealing. From the review effective from the election of 1983 it became Ealing Acton. 
Components
1918–74: Acton M.B. Note per the London Government Act 1963 the Metropolitan Borough ceased to exist in 1965, its functions being replaced by the larger London Borough of Ealing.
1974–83: Six wards (the old area plus the centre of the new larger borough, further west), namely:
The London Borough of Ealing wards: Central, East, Hanger Hill, Heathfield, Southfield and Springfield.

The change was extension, along all of the former western edge.

Members of Parliament

Elections

Elections in the 1910s

Elections in the 1920s

Elections in the 1930s

Elections in the 1940s

Elections in the 1950s

Elections in the 1960s

Elections in the 1970s

References

Parliamentary constituencies in London (historic)
Constituencies of the Parliament of the United Kingdom established in 1918
Constituencies of the Parliament of the United Kingdom disestablished in 1983
History of the London Borough of Ealing
Politics of the London Borough of Ealing
Acton, London